Oleksandr Kablash (born 5 September 1989) is a Ukrainian footballer.

Career

Club
Kablash began his career in the youth team of Chornomorets Odesa, joining Illichivets Mariupol on loan in 2007.
In November 2008, Kablash signed for Dnister Ovidiopol.

In January 2015, Kablash moved to the Uzbek League, signing for Nasaf. After parting ways with FC Istiklol in June 2016, Kablash was linked with a move to Vorskla Poltava, before eventually signing for Dacia Chișinău.

Career statistics

Club

Honours
Ekranas
A Lyga (1): 2010
 Istiklol
Tajik Supercup (1): 2016

References

1989 births
Living people
Ukrainian footballers
Ukraine youth international footballers
Ukrainian expatriate footballers
Expatriate footballers in Uzbekistan
Expatriate footballers in Tajikistan
FC Istiklol players
Ukrainian expatriate sportspeople in Uzbekistan
Ukrainian expatriate sportspeople in Tajikistan
Footballers from Odesa
Association football midfielders
FC Chornomorets Odesa players
FC Mariupol players
FC Bukovyna Chernivtsi players
SC Tavriya Simferopol players
FC Dnister Ovidiopol players
MFC Mykolaiv players
FC Helios Kharkiv players
FC Nasaf players
FC Dacia Chișinău players
FK Ekranas players
FC Sogdiana Jizzakh players
Expatriate footballers in Moldova
Ukrainian expatriate sportspeople in Moldova
Expatriate footballers in Lithuania
Ukrainian expatriate sportspeople in Lithuania
Tajikistan Higher League players
Ukrainian Premier League players
Ukrainian First League players
A Lyga players
Uzbekistan Super League players
Moldovan Super Liga players